A Matter of Loaf and Death is a 2008 British stop-motion animated short film produced by Aardman Animations, created by Nick Park, and is the fourth short to star his characters Wallace and Gromit, the first one since A Close Shave in 1995.

A Matter of Loaf and Death is a murder mystery, with Wallace and Gromit starting a new bakery business. With an unknown assailant murdering bakers, Gromit tries to solve the case before Wallace ends up a victim himself. It was the last Wallace and Gromit film before the retirement of Wallace's voice actor Peter Sallis in 2010 before his death in 2017. The short was also one of the most watched television specials in the United Kingdom in 2008 and received critical acclaim. It received an Oscar nomination for Best Animated Short Film at the 82nd Academy Awards, losing to Logorama, and won a BAFTA and an Annie Award for Best Short Animation and Best Animated Short Subject respectively in 2009.

Plot
A serial killer has murdered twelve bakers. While on a delivery for their bakery business, Wallace and Gromit save Piella Bakewell, a former pin-up girl for the Bake-O-Lite bread company, and her nervous poodle Fluffles when the brakes on her bicycle fail. Gromit finds there is no problem with the brakes, but Wallace is smitten. He and Piella begin a whirlwind romance, and Gromit is angered when she redecorates their house. Fluffles and Gromit share a sensitive moment when she returns Gromit's possessions, discarded by Piella.

Wallace sends Gromit to return Piella's forgotten purse. At Piella's mansion, Gromit discovers numbered mannequins representing each of the murdered bakers, and an album containing photographs showing Piella in relationships with each one; Wallace is her planned thirteenth victim, completing a baker's dozen. When he shows Wallace the evidence, Wallace is too distracted with his engagement to Piella to listen.

Gromit installs security measures in their home, including a metal-detecting security screener. After Piella tricks Wallace into thinking that Gromit bit her by biting her own arm, Wallace muzzles Gromit and chains him up. Gromit watches helplessly as Piella prepares to push Wallace to his death, but he is saved when Piella is struck by a bag of flour. After an angry outburst about bakers, she leaves but drops by the next day to apologise with a cake. Gromit, suspicious, follows her home, where Piella throws him into a storeroom with Fluffles.

Escaping in Piella's old Bake-O-Lite hot air balloon, Gromit and Fluffles arrive at Wallace's house as he lights the candle. After a struggle, the cake falls, revealing it to be a bomb. Wallace and Gromit are attacked by Piella, who reveals she detests bakers after her weight gain ended her career as the Bake-O-Lite girl. She is about to kill Wallace but is attacked by Fluffles in a forklift. In the chaos, the bomb ends up in Wallace's trousers; Gromit and Fluffles neutralise the explosion by filling the trousers with dough while Piella leaps onto her balloon and escapes. However, her weight drags the balloon into the zoo and right to a crocodile enclosure where she is fatally devoured.

Dejected, Wallace and Gromit decide to take their mind off their great adventure, especially the battle they had with Piella, with a delivery. Outside, they find Fluffles and she joins them.

Cast
 Peter Sallis as Wallace
 Sally Lindsay as Piella Bakewell
 Melissa Collier as Fluffles
 Sarah Laborde as Bake-O-Lite singer
 Ben Whitehead as Baker Bob (uncredited)
 Geraldine McEwan as Miss Thripp (uncredited)

Production
In October 2007, it was announced that Wallace and Gromit were to return to television after an absence of ten years with a new short film titled Wallace and Gromit: Trouble At' Mill. Filming began in January 2008; creator Nick Park commented that the production period for the short was significantly quicker than that of the feature-length films Chicken Run and The Curse of the Were-Rabbit, which each took five years to complete. A Matter of Loaf and Death was the first Aardman film to be made using the software Stop-Motion Pro. Five models were created for Gromit alone, with scenes being shot simultaneously on thirteen sets.

Commenting on the fact that the short would be made directly for a British audience, Nick Park said: "I don't feel like I'm making a film for a kid in some suburb of America — and being told they're not going to understand a joke, or a northern saying." Regardless, Park changed the title from Trouble at Mill as he thought it was too obscure a Northern England colloquialism. As well as a final title that references A Matter of Life and Death, the film also references Batman, Aliens and Ghost.

Park said in an interview with the Radio Times, "The BBC hardly gave a single note or instruction on the whole thing", and Park goes on to remark how it was better than his previous work with DreamWorks, Curse of the Were-Rabbit, where they kept on receiving calls to change critical things.

Park cast Sally Lindsay after hearing her on the Radcliffe and Maconie Show on BBC Radio 2 whilst driving from Preston. Although unfamiliar with her role as Shelly Unwin in Coronation Street, Park said "Sally has a lot of fun in her voice, flamboyant almost, and I was also looking for someone who could be quite charming too, but with a slightly posh northern accent. Piella needed to at times sound well to do, and then at others sound quite gritty".

Release
The short had its world premiere in Australia, on the Australian Broadcasting Corporation's ABC1 on 3 December 2008, and was repeated again the following day on ABC2.

In the United Kingdom, it aired on Christmas Day at 20:30 on BBC One, although it had been readily available on The Pirate Bay since 3 December 2008. On 19 December 2008, Aardman Animations revealed they had "no idea" of how clips were leaked onto YouTube, ahead of its screening in the United Kingdom.

In France, A Matter of Loaf and Death (Sacré pétrin in French) was shown – dubbed into French – on Christmas Eve 2008, on M6. In Germany, one version, entitled Auf Leben und Brot was broadcast on the Super RTL network, the title is a play on Auf Leben und Tod meaning a matter of life and death.

In a similar style to A Close Shave, Wallace and Gromit became the theme for BBC One's Christmas presentation for 2008, to promote the showing of A Matter of Loaf and Death.

Reception
The programme was watched by the most viewers of any programme on Christmas Day 2008 in the United Kingdom and secured the largest Christmas Day audience in five years. It was also the most watched programme in the United Kingdom in 2008, with a peak average audience of 14.4 million. The programme had a share of 53.3%, peaking with 58.1% and 15.88 million at the end of the programme.

The repeat showing on New Year's Day 2009 even managed 7.2 million, beating ITV's Emmerdale in the ratings. The short was shown on British television for the third time on Good Friday 2009, pulling in 3.4 million viewers. In BARB's official ratings published on 8 January 2009, it showed that A Matter of Loaf and Death had 16.15 million, making it the highest rated programme of 2008, and the highest rated non-sporting event in the United Kingdom since 2004, when an episode of Coronation Street garnered 16.3 million.

A positive review came from USA Today, which gave the film four stars.

Awards
Won
 2009 – BAFTA Award – Best Short Animation
 2009 – Annie Award – Best Animated Short Subject

Nominated
 2010 – Academy Award – Best Animated Short Film

References

External links
 
  (archived)
 
 
 Film Production Blog at the official Wallace and Gromit website

Wallace and Gromit films
Films directed by Nick Park
2008 television films
2008 films
2008 short films
2008 black comedy films
2000s serial killer films
2000s mystery films
2008 romantic comedy films
British black comedy films
British mystery films
British animated short films
British children's comedy films
British serial killer films
Animated comedy films
Stop-motion animated short films
Films about death
BAFTA winners (films)
Best Animated Short Subject Annie Award winners
Clay animation films
BBC Television shows
Aardman Animations short films
Films with screenplays by Nick Park
2000s stop-motion animated films
Murder in films
Murder mystery films
2000s English-language films
2000s British films